Dendropoma petraeum is a species of sea snail, a marine gastropod mollusk in the family Vermetidae, the worm snails or worm shells.

Description

Distribution

References

External links
 Lunetta G. D’A. & Damiani F. (2002). "Spermiogenesis in the vermetid gastropod Dendropoma petraeum (Gastropoda, Prosobranchia)". European Journal of Histochemistry 46(1): 75-86. . abstract, PDF.

Vermetidae
Gastropods described in 1884